King Liu (born 2 July 1934) is the founder of Taiwanese bicycle manufacturer Giant Bicycles.

Liu was not a cyclist himself before founding Giant. However, in 2007, at age 73, he rode around Taiwan on a bicycle, and at age 75 he rode from Beijing to Shanghai.

Liu was a major participant in the creation of Taiwan's YouBike system.

References 

Living people
Businesspeople from Taichung
1934 births